João Pedro Barradas Novais (born 10 July 1993) is a Portuguese professional footballer who plays for Emirati club Al Bataeh Club as a midfielder.

He played 129 Primeira Liga games and scored 13 goals for Rio Ave and Braga, winning the 2019–20 Taça da Liga and the 2020–21 Taça de Portugal with the latter club, as well as having spells in Turkey and the United Arab Emirates.

Club career

Leixões
Born in Vila Nova de Gaia, Porto metropolitan area, Novais was in the youth ranks of FC Porto before concluding his development at nearby Leixões SC. He scored his first professional goal on 11 May 2014 in the final game of the Segunda Liga season, a penalty kick to equalise in a 1–1 home draw against C.F. União.

Rio Ave
On 3 July 2015, Novais signed for Primeira Liga club Rio Ave F.C. on a four-year deal. He scored twice in his first season with the team from Vila do Conde, including the leveller in a 1–1 draw at Porto on 6 January. In 2017–18 he recorded a career-best eight league goals (mostly from free kicks), and two more in the Taça da Liga in a 3–2 group stage home win over former team Leixões.

Braga
Novais transferred to fellow top-flight club S.C. Braga in May 2018, on a five-year deal after activating his €1.5 million buyout clause. He scored his first goal on 16 August in a 2–2 home draw with FC Zorya Luhansk in the third qualifying round of the UEFA Europa League, though his side was eliminated on the away goals rule; his first league season at the Estádio Municipal de Braga yielded one goal, consolation in the 6–2 away loss to S.L. Benfica on 23 December. 

On 25 January 2020, Novais was a last-minute substitute for João Palhinha in the League Cup final, which his team won 1–0 against Porto. Four days later he was sent off at the end of a 2–1 victory at nearby Moreirense F.C. for a foul on Abdu Conté, and missed the next game against Sporting CP through suspension. In the following season's Taça de Portugal, he scored a penalty kick in a 7–0 defeat of Clube Olímpico do Montijo in the fourth round, and came off the bench in the 2–1 final win over Benfica on 23 May 2021.

Novais was loaned to Alanyaspor of the Turkish Süper Lig on 19 August 2021 with an option to buy. He shared teams with compatriots José Marafona, Daniel Candeias and Wilson Eduardo during his one season.

Al Bataeh
Novais cancelled the last year of his Braga contract on 11 August 2022, and signed for UAE Pro League side Al Bataeh Club. He scored on his debut on 2 September, concluding a 2–0 win at Ittihad Kalba FC on the first day of the campaign.

Personal life
Novais' father Abílio also played as a midfielder, being best known for his spell at S.C. Salgueiros in the late 1990s.

Honours
Braga
Taça de Portugal: 2020–21
Taça da Liga: 2019–20

References

External links

1993 births
Living people
Sportspeople from Vila Nova de Gaia
Portuguese footballers
Association football midfielders
Primeira Liga players
Liga Portugal 2 players
Padroense F.C. players
Leixões S.C. players
Rio Ave F.C. players
S.C. Braga players
Süper Lig players
Alanyaspor footballers
UAE Pro League players
Al Bataeh Club players
Portuguese expatriate footballers
Expatriate footballers in Turkey
Expatriate footballers in the United Arab Emirates
Portuguese expatriate sportspeople in Turkey
Portuguese expatriate sportspeople in the United Arab Emirates